The official results of the Women's Pole Vault at the 2003 World Championships in Paris, France, held on Monday August 25, 2003. There were a total number of 27 competitors.

Medalists

Schedule
All times are Central European Time (UTC+1)

Abbreviations
All results shown are in metres

Records

Results

Final

Qualification
Held on Saturday 2003-08-23

See also
 1999 Women's World Championships Pole Vault (Seville)
 2000 Women's Olympic Pole Vault (Sydney)
 2001 Women's World Championships Pole Vault (Edmonton)
 2002 Women's European Championships Pole Vault (Munich)
 2003 Women's Pan American Games Pole Vault (Santo Domingo)
 2004 Women's Olympic Pole Vault (Athens)
 2005 Women's World Championships Pole Vault (Helsinki)
 2006 Women's European Championships Pole Vault (Gothenburg)

References
 Results
 IAAF Results

P
Pole vault at the World Athletics Championships
2003 in women's athletics